The Claymore class was a group of thirteen  (destroyers) built for the French Navy in the first decade of the 20th century. All of the ships survived the First World War and were scrapped after the war.

Ships

Bibliography

 
 
 

 
Destroyer classes
Destroyers of the French Navy
 
Ship classes of the French Navy